Agdistis endrodyi is a moth in the family Pterophoridae. It is known from South Africa (Western Cape).

The wingspan is 20–30 mm. The forewings are light grey with sharp dots, two dots in the discal area almost confluenting into an oblique streak. The two other dots are found in the middle part and at the wing base. Adults are on wing in October.

Etymology
The species is named after Dr S. Endrödy-Younga, a famous South African entomologist.

References

Endemic moths of South Africa
Agdistinae
Moths of Africa
Moths described in 2009